Petros Karatroupkos (1929 – January 31, 2012) was the Greek Orthodox bishop of Zambia 2001–2003.

Notes

1929 births
2012 deaths
Bishops of the Greek Orthodox Church of Alexandria
White Zambian people
Zambian bishops
Zambian people of Greek descent
Eastern Orthodox Christians from Zambia